The Venerable Guy Etton was an Anglican priest in the late 16th and early 17th  centuries.

He was educated at the University of Oxford. He held livings at St. James the Elder, Horton, Gloucestershire and  St. Leonard, Shoreditch. He was Archdeacon of Gloucester from 1559 to 1571. He died in 1577.

Notes 

1577 deaths
Alumni of the University of Oxford
Archdeacons of Gloucester
16th-century English Anglican priests